Abdoulaye Keita (born 5 January 1994) is a Malian professional footballer who plays as a defensive midfielder.

Career
On 26 June 2018, Panionios announced Keita's signing for the team. On 17 January 2022, he joined Prix-lès-Mézières.

References

External links

1994 births
Living people
Sportspeople from Bamako
Association football midfielders
Malian footballers
SC Bastia players
Le Havre AC players
AC Ajaccio players
Panionios F.C. players
Olympiacos F.C. players
Jura Dolois Football players
AS Prix-lès-Mézières players
21st-century Malian people
Malian expatriate footballers
Expatriate footballers in France
Expatriate footballers in Greece
Malian expatriate sportspeople in France
Malian expatriate sportspeople in Greece
Championnat National 3 players
Ligue 1 players
Championnat National 2 players
Ligue 2 players
Super League Greece players